The 1963 Baltimore Colts season was the 11th season for the team in the National Football League. The Baltimore Colts finished the National Football League's 1963 season with a record of 8 wins and 6 losses and finished third in the Western Conference.

Roster

Regular season

Schedule

Standings

Season summary

Week 4 at Bears

See also 
History of the Indianapolis Colts
Indianapolis Colts seasons
Colts–Patriots rivalry

Baltimore Colts
1963
Baltimore Colts